Ivan Serhiyovych Matyazh (born 15 February 1988) is a Ukrainian professional football striker who plays for Karlovac 1919.

External links
 
 

1988 births
Living people
Footballers from Donetsk
Ukrainian footballers
Ukraine youth international footballers
Association football midfielders
FC Shakhtar-2 Donetsk players
FC Shakhtar-3 Donetsk players
FC Zorya Luhansk players
FC Olimpik Donetsk players
SC Tavriya Simferopol players
FC Metalurh Zaporizhzhia players
FC Mariupol players
NK Istra 1961 players
FC Chornomorets Odesa players
FC Kramatorsk players
FC Obolon-Brovar Kyiv players
NK Karlovac players
Ukrainian Premier League players
Ukrainian First League players
Ukrainian Second League players
Croatian Football League players
Ukrainian expatriate footballers
Expatriate footballers in Croatia
Ukrainian expatriate sportspeople in Croatia